Swan Village is an area of West Bromwich, England. The population taken at the 2011 census can be found in the West Bromwich listing.

It is now divided by the Black Country New Road and was the site of the Swan Village Gas Works. Nearby was the junction of the Ridgacre Branch with the Wednesbury Old Canal, both now disused.

The Great Bridge line closed in 1964 as a result of the Beeching cuts with Swan Village station eventually facing closure in 1972. A level crossing was situated at one end of the former station, and Black Lake tram stop on the West Midlands Metro route is situated on the other side of this crossing.

References

External links

Areas of the West Midlands (county)
West Bromwich